Tej Tamang (born 14 February 1998) is a Nepali footballer who plays as a Midlfeild  Nepali club Kathmandu Rayzrs and the Nepal national team.

Honours
Nepal Super League Champions (1) 2021

References

External links
 

Living people
1998 births
Nepalese footballers
Nepal international footballers
Association football midfielders
Footballers at the 2018 Asian Games
Tamang people